The Heart of a Girl is a lost 1918 American silent drama film directed by John G. Adolfi and starring Barbara Castleton, Irving Cummings and Charles Wellesley.

Cast
 Barbara Castleton as Betty Lansing 
 Irving Cummings as Brandon Kent 
 Charles Wellesley as Francis Oakland 
 Kate Lester as Mrs. Lansing 
 Ricca Allen as Mrs. Ogden 
 William T. Carleton as Sen. Murray 
 Gladys Valerie as Helen Murray 
 Florence Coventry as Mrs. Oakland 
 Clay Clement as J. Drake 
 Anthony Byrd as Abe 
 Inez Shannon as Mrs. Murphy 
 John Tansey as Jack 
 J. Blake as Johnson 
L. Canfield as Johnson's manager 
 Joseph W. Smiley as Kent's manager

References

Bibliography
 Paul C. Spehr. The Movies Begin: Making Movies in New Jersey, 1887-1920. Newark Museum, 1977.

External links

1918 films
1918 drama films
Silent American drama films
Films directed by John G. Adolfi
American silent feature films
1910s English-language films
American black-and-white films
World Film Company films
1910s American films